A Child in the Crowd is a 1976 French drama film directed by Gérard Blain. It was entered into the 1976 Cannes Film Festival.

Cast
 Jean François Cimino as Paul, enfant
 César Chauveau as Paul, adolescent
 Annie Kovaks as La mère de Paul
 Cécile Cousseau as Micheline, enfant
 Claude Treille as Micheline, adolescente
 Jean Bertal as Le père de Paul
 Gabrielle Sassoum as La grand-mère
 Raymonde Badé-Mauffroy as La maîtresse (as Raymonde Mauffroy)
 Jacques Benoît-Lévy as Directeur école
 Claude Cernay as Gilles
 Jurgens Doeres as Laurent
 Bernard Soufflet as Jacques

References

External links

1976 films
1970s teen drama films
1970s coming-of-age drama films
1976 LGBT-related films
French teen drama films
French LGBT-related films
1970s French-language films
French coming-of-age drama films
Films directed by Gérard Blain
LGBT-related drama films
1970s French films